Jasper is a city in Pickens County, Georgia, United States. The population was 3,684 at the 2010 census. The city is the county seat of Pickens County.

History
Jasper was founded in 1853 as seat of the newly formed Pickens County. It was incorporated in 1857 as a town and in 1957 as a city. The community is named for William Jasper, a hero of the American Revolutionary War.

Geography
Jasper is located at  (34.469127, -84.434039).

Georgia State Route 53 passes through the center of Jasper, while Georgia State Routes 5 and 515 bypass the city to its west. GA-5/515 lead north  to Ellijay and south  to Atlanta, via its connection with Interstate 575, which ends just south of the city. GA-53 runs through the downtown area as an east–west highway, leading east  on a winding and mountainous route to Dawsonville, and west  to Calhoun along Interstate 75.

Demographics

2020 census

As of the 2020 United States census, there were 4,084 people, 1,560 households, and 889 families residing in the city.

2000 census
As of the census of 2000, there were 2,167 people, 942 households, and 575 families residing in the city. The racial makeup of the city was 91.74% White, 4.38% African American, 0.18% Native American, 0.74% Asian, 0.05% Pacific Islander, 2.12% from other races, and 0.78% from two or more races. Hispanic or Latino people of any race were 3.23% of the population.

There were 942 households, out of which 28.5% had children under the age of 18 living with them, 44.5% were married couples living together, 13.3% had a female householder with no husband present, and 38.9% were non-families. 35.0% of all households were made up of individuals, and 18.7% had someone living alone who was 65 years of age or older. The average household size was 2.24 and the average family size was 2.82.

In the city, the population was spread out, with 22.9% under the age of 18, 7.5% from 18 to 24, 26.9% from 25 to 44, 23.5% from 45 to 64, and 19.2% who were 65 years of age or older. The median age was 40 years. For every 100 females, there were 80.0 males. For every 100 females age 18 and over, there were 75.7 males.

The median income for a household in the city was $31,944, and the median income for a family was $40,833. Males had a median income of $30,774 versus $25,489 for females. The per capita income for the city was $19,184. About 9.2% of families and 15.8% of the population were below the poverty line, including 22.1% of those under age 18 and 19.5% of those age 65 or over.

Education

Pickens County School District
The Pickens County School District holds pre-school to grade 12, and consists of four elementary schools, two middle schools, and a high school. The district has 248 full-time teachers and roughly 4,400 students.
Harmony Elementary School
Hill City Elementary School
Tate Elementary School
Jasper Middle School
Pickens Jr High School
Pickens High School

Higher education
Chattahoochee Technical College - Appalachian Campus

Points of interest

Nicknamed "The First Mountain City," Jasper is located 50 miles north of Atlanta.

The Tate House was built by local marble baron Sam Tate in the 1920s and now sits adjacent to Tate Elementary and is on the National Register of Historic Places. Standing on an old Cherokee place of worship, the historic Woodbridge Inn is a restaurant and inn.

Jasper is located near several large acreage mountain neighborhoods such as Big Canoe, Bent Tree, and the Preserve at Sharp Mountain.

Events
The Georgia Marble Festival is held on the first weekend in October every year. It is sponsored by the Pickens County Chamber of Commerce, and held at Lee Newton Park.

The festivities start with the Marble Festival Road Race. There are booths with local vendors selling handmade crafts, among other things. Another highlight is the art show, with exhibits of carved marble, as well as paintings, photographs, and pottery.

The Apple Festival is held the following two weekends in nearby Ellijay, Georgia (Gilmer County).

Notable people
 Jeremiah Boswell - basketball player
 James Larry Edmondson - judge
 Weldon Henley (1880-1960) - MLB pitcher
 Chandler Smith - NASCAR driver

References

Cities in Georgia (U.S. state)
Cities in Pickens County, Georgia
County seats in Georgia (U.S. state)